Colonel Claude Pivi is a Guinean military and political figure, member of the National Council for Democracy and Development (CNDD) and a Minister since December 2008. In 2013 he was charged in connection with the Guinea stadium massacre of 28 September 2009, in which 157 were killed by troops. The BBC describe Pivi as a "leading figure in the CNDD military junta led by Capt Moussa Dadis Camara at the time of the massacre".

References

Government ministers of Guinea
Guinean military personnel
Living people
Year of birth missing (living people)
Place of birth missing (living people)